Sinfra is a city in central Ivory Coast. It is a sub-prefecture and the seat of Sinfra Department in Marahoué Region, Sassandra-Marahoué District. Sinfra is also a commune.

In 2021, the population of the sub-prefecture of Sinfra was 137,210.

Villages
The 26 villages of the sub-prefecture of Sinfra and their population in 2014 are:

Notes

Sub-prefectures of Marahoué
Communes of Marahoué